List of cemeteries in Boston includes currently operating, historical (closed for new interments), and defunct (graves abandoned or removed) cemeteries, columbaria, and mausolea which are historical and/or notable. It does not include pet cemeteries.

See also
 Boston Cemetery in Boston, Lincolnshire in England
 List of cemeteries in Massachusetts
 List of cemeteries in the United States

References

External links
 Kings Chapel Burying Ground

Cemeteries
Boston